Enscape is a commercial real-time rendering and virtual reality plugin. It is mainly used in the architecture, engineering, and construction fields and is developed and maintained by Enscape GmbH, founded in 2013 and based in Karlsruhe, Germany with an office in New York, United States. In 2022, Enscape's developer Enscape GmbH merged with Chaos, developer of competing rendering software V-Ray.

Overview 
The main focus of Enscape lies in the calculation of realistic visualizations of architecture with low operating complexity. A real-time method is applied to achieve higher iteration speeds at the planning project by reducing waiting times. The respective CAD model is used, for example, to derive a virtual reality simulation.

Enscape uses OpenGL 4.4 and Vulkan and provides photorealistic representations of the underlying CAD models. With the help of a path-tracing procedure and physically based material models, the global illumination can be visualized realistically.

The following design solutions are currently supported:

 Revit
 SketchUp
 Rhinoceros 3D
 ArchiCAD
 Vectorworks

Special Features of the Renderer 

 Enscape is based on the self-developed renderer optimized for architectural visualization
 GPU controlled rendering technologies are used to display all architectural project sizes without loss of detail (e.g. by LOD [level of detail])
 Hybrid ray tracing to simulate physically correct indirect lighting and reflection, combining image-based screen space techniques with BVH based global data structures
 Global lighting calculations can thus be performed very quickly and largely independently of the complexity of the project

References

Further reading 

 Eric Haines, Tomas Akenine-Möller: Ray Tracing Gems, Apress, Berkeley, CA (2019),  Website
 John G. Brook, SketchUp for Builders: A Comprehensive Guide for Creating 3D Building Models Using SketchUp, Wiley; 1 edition (December 27, 2018)  P. 329–332
 Lance Kirby, Eddy Krygiel, Marcus Kim, Mastering Autodesk Revit 2018, John Wiley & Sons Inc (July 2017) , P. 518 & 522
 Jeff Hanson, Daniel John Stine, Autodesk Revit 2019 Architectural Command Reference, SDC Publications (May 4, 2018), Chapter 2 P. 2, Chapter 5 P. 14, Chapter 10 P. 29
 Christoph van Treeck, Thomas Kistemann, Christian Schauer, Gebäudetechnik als Strukturgeber für Bau- und Betriebsprozesse, Springer Vieweg; Auflage: 1. Aufl. 2019 (October 26, 2018),   P. 74-76
 Anisha Sankar (2019). Design Architecture in Virtual Reality. UWSpace. Website
 K. Hoolahan, 2019, Gamification of exercise for Fibromyalgia using virtual reality, in Proceedings of Virtual Reality International Conference (VRIC), S. Richir Ed, 20-  22 March, Laval, France, Publisher: LavalVirtual, www.laval-virtual.com,

External links 

 Nvidia Quadro RTX 4000 review, AEC Magazine, 03.01.2019 (Benchmark testing RTX with help of Enscape)
 Bob Pette: Prepare for Future of Design: Introducing the Quadro RTX 4000 , Nvidia Blog, 12.10.2018 (Showcasing the RTX 4000 using Enscape)
 Andreas Schilling: Bistro-Demo mit Hybrid-Ray-Tracing neu erstellt, Hardwareluxx, 04.03.2019
 Glenn Howells shows how IT can inject time into creative process, PlaceTech, 03.26.2019
 Greg Corke: Five tools for real-time rendering, AEC Magazine, 09.21.2018
 Nadia Cameron: VR tapped by Sydney hospital to engage visitors and staff in redevelopment, CMO From IDG, 02.11.2019
 Katherine Allen: Exploring Your Project in Virtual Reality, ArchDaily, 01.14.2019
 Rich Thomas: Gensler Project Architect Nate Dison Solves Problems and Sets Precedents, Autodesk's Redshift, 01.31.2018
 Henry T. Casey: HP Brings VR to its Workstations in G4 ZBook Lineup, Laptop Mag, 04.17.2017
 Camille Khouri: Black mirrors: part two, ArchitectureNow, 04.20.2018
 Tom Sawyer, Jeff Rubenstone, and Scott Lewis: Making Construction Innovation Stick, 02.14.2018
 Hyeyun Jung: Collaborative Design Process With Enscape Plug-In, 05.16.2018

2022 mergers and acquisitions
Rendering systems
3D rendering